Víctor Pastrana Carrasco (born 27 September 1996) is a Spanish professional footballer who plays for Extremadura UD as a winger.

Football career
Born in Guadalajara, Castile-La Mancha, Pastrana joined AD Alcorcón's youth setup in 2012, aged 15, after starting it out at CF Trival Valderas. In October 2014, before even having appeared for the reserves, he was called up to train with the main squad.

On 25 January 2015 Pastrana played his first match as a professional, coming on as a second half substitute for Kiko Femenía in a 2–3 home loss against Albacete Balompié in the Segunda División. Shortly after, he was definitely promoted to the first team.

On 21 July 2016, Pastrana was loaned to Segunda División B club SD Ponferradina, for one year. Upon returning, he cut ties with the club on 4 July 2017 and signed a two-year deal with Celta de Vigo B just hours later.

On 9 July 2019, free agent Pastrana signed a three-year contract with Extremadura UD in the second division.

International career
On 8 February 2015 Pastrana was called up to the Spain under-19 team, and made his debut on 29 May, in a 4–1 routing of Georgia; he was the first Alcorcón player to appear in any international level for Spain.

References

External links

Alcorcón official profile 

1996 births
Living people
People from Guadalajara, Spain
Sportspeople from the Province of Guadalajara
Spanish footballers
Footballers from Castilla–La Mancha
Association football wingers
Segunda División players
Segunda División B players
AD Alcorcón B players
AD Alcorcón footballers
SD Ponferradina players
Celta de Vigo B players
Extremadura UD footballers
Spain youth international footballers